The Five Mile Act, or Oxford Act, or Nonconformists Act 1665, was an Act of the Parliament of England (17 Charles II c. 2), passed in 1665 with the long title "An Act for restraining Non-Conformists from inhabiting in Corporations". It was one of the English penal laws that sought to enforce conformity to the established Church of England, and to expel any who did not conform. It forbade clergymen from living within five miles (8 km) of a parish from which they had been expelled, unless they swore an oath never to resist the king, or attempt to alter the government of Church or State.  The latter involved swearing to obey the 1662 prayer book.  Thousands of ministers were deprived of a living under this act.

As an example, Theodosia Alleine and her husband Joseph Alleine were obliged to move to Taunton after her husband's conviction as a non-conformist. They moved, but they were still harassed and had to move and live with friends to escape their critics.

See also
Conventicle Act 1664
Religion in the United Kingdom
Declaration of Indulgence (disambiguation)

References

Sources 
 
 

Acts of the Parliament of England concerning religion
1665 in law
1665 in England
Christianity and law in the 17th century
1665 in religion